"Gusheshe" is a song by South African hip hop recording artist Cassper Nyovest, released as the first single from his debut studio album Tsholofelo. It was released on 19 April 2013 and features a guest verse from Okmalumkoolkat. The song was written by Nyovest and Okmalumkoolkat. It was produced by Ganja Beatz with co-production from Nyovest.

The artwork, released on April 17, 2013, features a pink 1983 BMW 325i coupé, known commonly as a "gusheshe" in South Africa. Upon its debut, the song received high rotation on radio stations including YFM and 5FM.

Due to its positive reception, Nyovest won 4 awards for the song at the 2nd Annual South African Hip Hop Awards. It was also licensed for a Sprite commercial in the United States.

Awards and nominations

South African Hip Hop Awards

!Ref
|-
|rowspan="4"|2013
|rowspan="4"|"Gusheshe"
|Song of the Year
|
|
|-
|Best Collaboration
|
|
|-
|Video of the Year
|
|
|-
|Best Freshman
|
|
|-

Track listing

Music video
The music video was directed by Nicky Campos and debuted on Vuzu TV's V-Entertainment on 19 July 2013.

References

2013 singles
2013 songs
Hip hop songs
Cassper Nyovest songs